Jake Armstrong (born 17 March 1994) is an English rugby union player. Armstrong's primary position is prop.

Rugby Union career

Professional career

Armstrong played for Leeds Tykes, Doncaster Knights and Jersey Reds before joining the Bristol Bears in 2018. He joined Edinburgh on loan in February 2022. He made his Edinburgh debut on 11 February in the re-arranged Round 8 match of the 2021–22 United Rugby Championship against . He departed Bristol Bears on 26 October 2022, he had been on loan to Doncaster Knights since September.

External links
itsrugby Profile

References

1994 births
Living people
Leeds Tykes players
Doncaster Knights players
Jersey Reds players
Bristol Bears players
Hartpury University R.F.C. players
Edinburgh Rugby players
Rugby union props
English rugby union players